Aurelio Lucchini (died 1989) was a Uruguayan architect and architectural historian.

From March 1983 till his death he was a member of the Academia Nacional de Letras del Uruguay.

Selected works
Cronología comparada de la historia del Uruguay 1830-1945, with Blanca París de Oddone, Carlos Real de Azúa, Otilia Muras, Arturo Ardao, Washington Buño, Lauro Ayestarán, and Susana Salgado; Montevideo, 1966.
Ideas y formas en la arquitectura nacional. Colección Nuestra Tierra, Vol. 6, Montevideo, 1969.
Julio Vilamajó. Su arquitectura, with the collaboration of Mariano Arana; FArq, IHA, Montevideo, 1970.
El Concepto de Arquitectura y su traducción a formas en el territorio que hoy pertenece a Uruguay. Universidad de la República, Montevideo, 1986.

References

Year of birth missing
1989 deaths
Uruguayan people of Italian descent
University of the Republic (Uruguay) alumni
Academic staff of the University of the Republic (Uruguay)
Uruguayan architects
Uruguayan architectural historians
Members of the Uruguayan Academy of Language